Adelaide T. C. Carpenter (born June 24, 1944) is an American fruit fly geneticist at the University of Cambridge.

Biography
Carpenter was born 24 June 1944, in Georgia, United States and grew up in North Carolina. In the 1970s, whilst at the University of Washington, she was one of the numerous graduate students mentored by Larry Sandler.
In 1976, she obtained a faculty position at the University of California, San Diego. In 1989, after becoming full professor, she took a second sabbatical in the United Kingdom.

Scientific work
In 1975, Carpenter discovered and published a paper on the recombination nodule, an organelle that mediates meiotic recombination.

Media appearances
 The Immortalists (2014)
 Do You Want to Live Forever? (2007)

References

Further reading

 Web page at University of Cambridge

Living people
1944 births
American geneticists
University of California, San Diego faculty
Scientists from California
Scientists from Georgia (U.S. state)
North Carolina State University alumni
Scientists from North Carolina
University of Washington alumni
20th-century American scientists
20th-century American women scientists
21st-century American scientists
21st-century American women scientists